This is a list of places on the Victorian Heritage Register in the City of Monash in Victoria, Australia. The Victorian Heritage Register is maintained by the Heritage Council of Victoria.

The Victorian Heritage Register, as of 2020, lists the following seven state-registered places within the City of Monash:

References

Monash
City of Monash